The Rural Municipality of Odanah is a former rural municipality (RM) in the Canadian province of Manitoba. It was originally incorporated as a rural municipality on December 22, 1883. Its name comes from the Ojibwe word Oodena meaning a "village", a "community".  It ceased on January 1, 2015 as a result of its provincially mandated amalgamation with the RM of Minto to form the Rural Municipality of Minto – Odanah.

References

External links 
 Map of Odanah R.M. at Statcan

Odanah
Populated places disestablished in 2015
2015 disestablishments in Manitoba